Marius sweaters are Norwegian-style knitted sweaters with patterns inspired by traditional Setesdal sweater, but without lice, a type of pattern. While the traditional sweaters used the natural colors of sheep wool - black, gray, brown and white - Marius sweater designs incorporated colors, with the most common being red, white and blue, the colors of the Norwegian flag.

Origin 
The origin of the sweater has been subject to dispute in media. Designer  said she designed the pattern in 1953, influenced by traditional Norwegian knitting patterns found in the 1929 book Norske Strikkemønstre (Norwegian knitting patterns) by Annichen Sibbern. Designer  said she designed the pattern in the later 1920s, also inspired by the book by Sibbern, and that she in the beginning of 1950s had hired women who hand-knitted the sweater for sale in her shop. Erisen's daughter-in-law Bente Eriksen has said she was present when Dale visited Bitten Eriksen to learn the pattern Dale strongly disputed Bitten Eriksen's version, as does Dale's daughter, who currently holds the rights to the pattern for most commercial use.

Popularity 
Textile arts expert Annemor Møst estimated in 1999 that about 3,5 million copies of the knitting pattern had been sold and in 2008 estimated the number to be around 5 million and the number of sweaters that has been knitted based on the design as possibly multiple times more. Sandnes Uldvarefabrik estimated in 2011 that it had sold over five million copies of the pattern in a variety of color combinations.

Then Crown Prince, now King Harald V and Gro Harlem Brundtland are among those who have worn the sweater publicly.

See also 
 Lusekofte
 Lopapeysa
 Selburose

References

Literature 
 Vigdis Yran Dale, author Marius knitting Juritzen publishers, Oslo 2012, 
 Vigdis Yran Dale, author Marius inspiration Tiger Publishing House, Oslo 2014,

External links 
 Marius sweater - A Norwegian icon
 Marius and pattern
 Different types of Marius sweaters

Norwegian clothing
Knitted garments
Sweaters